Jana plagiatus is a moth in the family Eupterotidae. It was described by Lucien A. Berger in 1980. It is found in North Kivu province of the Democratic Republic of the Congo and in Malawi.

References

Moths described in 1980
Janinae